Michael Baumann may refer to:

Michael Bommi Baumann (1947–2016), German anarchist and writer
Mike Baumann (born 1995), American baseball pitcher